Judge Bailey may refer to:

Jennings Bailey (1867–1963), judge of the United States District Court for the District of Columbia
John P. Bailey (born 1951), judge of the United States District Court for the Northern District of West Virginia

See also
Justice Bailey (disambiguation)